A worldwide increase in inflation began in mid-2021, with many countries seeing their highest inflation rates in decades. It has been attributed to various causes, including pandemic-related economic dislocation; the fiscal and monetary stimuli provided in 2020 and 2021 by governments and central banks around the world in response to the pandemic were also instrumental. Unexpected recovery in demand through 2021 ultimately led to historic and broad supply shortages (including chip shortages and energy shortages) amid increasing consumer demand. Worldwide construction sectors were also hit.

In early 2022, the Russian invasion of Ukraine's effect on global oil prices, natural gas, fertilizer, and food prices further exacerbated the situation. Higher gasoline prices were a major contributor to inflation as oil producers saw record profits. Debate arose over whether inflationary pressures were transitory or persistent. Central banks responded by aggressively increasing interest rates.

Economists have noted that in the US as of February 2023, inflation has continued even though the Federal Reserve increased interest rates because consumers still have significantly larger average household savings than pre-pandemic, have seen wage increases, and have been willing to continue their spending even as prices have risen.

Background and causes

Consumer spending on goods moved in tandem with spending on services (see goods and services) prior to the COVID-19 recession, but upon emerging from the recession consumers shifted spending towards goods and away from services, particularly in the United States. This shift placed stress on supply chains, such that the supply of goods could not meet demand, resulting in price increases. In November 2021 inflation in the United States was 14.9% for durable goods, compared to 10.7% for consumable goods and 3.8% for services. Similar situations occurred in several other major economies. Supply chain stresses increased prices for commodities and transportation, which are cost inputs for finished goods.

In countries where food constituted a large part of the inflation increase, rising prices forced low-income consumers to reduce spending on other goods, thereby slowing economic growth. "In those countries with high inflation, consumer spending has weakened because household spending power has taken a hit from rising prices," said William Jackson of Capital Economics, "And you've generally seen much more aggressive moves to tighten monetary policy."

As of mid-2022, there was no consensus among economists as to the cause of the inflation surge. Several factors have been proposed and discussed.

Monetary policy

One theory, voiced by Stanford economist John B. Taylor and Johns Hopkins economists Steve Hanke and Nicholas Hanlon, is that the uptick in inflation in the U.S. was due to the large increase in the money supply, because M2 (a broad measure of the amount of money in the economy) grew at a record monthly rate of between 22% and 31% in the early months of the pandemic in 2020. Many governments adopted similar stimulatory actions around the world early in the COVID-19 pandemic.

Some immediate actions taken by banking systems across the country to combat the inflation surge, most banks today target the rate of inflation in a country as their primary way of measuring economic flow for monetary policy. When inflation is present banks will make changes to their monetary policy by increasing interest rates or making changes to other policies. Higher interest rates make borrowing more expensive, reducing consumption. This is put into place purposely to maintain a level of consumption that will contribute to a steady level of inflation or decrease it, this is also known as inflation targeting.

Supply chain crisis

Some economists attribute the U.S. inflation surge to product shortages resulting from the global supply-chain problems, itself largely caused by the COVID-19 pandemic. This coincided with strong consumer demand, driven by low unemployment and improved financial conditions following the pandemic. The higher demand caused by the U.S. government's $5 trillion aid spending exacerbated supply-side issues in the United States; according to the Federal Reserve Bank of San Francisco researchers, this contributed 3 percentage points to inflation by the end of 2021. They argued that the spending measures were nevertheless necessary to prevent deflation, which would've been harder to manage than inflation.

Consumer prices have reached an all-time high within the last thirty years, soaring by 6.2% from the previous year, things like restaurant prices to clothes and the most popular being fuel, have drastically increased. Fuel prices rose by 49% from January to June 2022 in the United States. All these skyrocketing statistics are due to the impact the pandemic and the impact the pandemic has had on things like consumer demand. During the pandemic, the amount of workers that were working worldwide plunged and had an immediate impact on the United States, less than a third of the global population has been vaccinated, this directly affects the U.S. because in countries that are leaders in supplying the United States in shoes and clothes like Vietnam are having factory hub shortages due to not having enough vaccinated workers.

In June 2022, BlackRock CEO Larry Fink argued that consumer demand in the United States had remained steady compared to pre-pandemic years, with supply-chain issues overseas being the primary cause of the post-pandemic inflation surge. He attributed this to some countries taking longer (than the U.S.) to resume economic activity, thereby disrupting international trade.

Price gouging and windfall profits concerns
Some analysts and politicians contend price gouging contributed to the inflation surge in the United States. They argued that in recent decades major industries, notably retailing, had concentrated into oligopolies that dominated markets and consequently wielded higher pricing power. Under such circumstances, consumers know prices are increasing but do not have good understanding of what reasonable prices should be, giving retailers the opportunity to raise prices faster than the cost inflation they were experiencing, thereby permanently locking in higher prices. A 2021 analysis conducted by The New York Times found that profit margins across more than 2,000 publicly traded companies were well above the pre-pandemic average during the year, as corporate profits reached a record high. Some economists disputed that price gouging was a significant contributor to inflation.

Shortly after initial energy price shocks caused by the 2022 Russian invasion of Ukraine subsided, oil companies found that supply chain constrictions, already exacerbated by the ongoing global COVID-19 pandemic, supported price inelasticity, i.e., they began lowering prices to match the price of oil when it fell much more slowly than they had increased their prices when costs rose. 

The major American and British oil producers (Big Oil) reported record profits in 2022. Amid longstanding constraints in refinery capacity, refinery profit margins were higher than their historical averages. In July, the UK imposed a 25% windfall profit tax on British North Sea oil producers, which expected to raise £5 billion to pay for a government scheme that reduced household energy costs. In late October, U.S. President Joe Biden accused the oil and gas sector of "war profiteering" and threatened to seek a windfall profit tax if the industry did not increase production to curb gasoline prices.

Similarly in the first quarter of 2022, meatpacking giant Tyson Foods relied on downward price inelasticity in packaged chicken and related products to increase their profits to about $500 million, responding to a $1.5 billion increase in their costs with almost $2 billion in price hikes. Tyson's three main competitors, having essentially no ability to compete on lower prices because supply chain constriction would not support an increase in volumes, followed suit. Tyson's quarter was one of their most profitable, expanding their operating margin 38%.

Justin Wolfers, an economist at the University of Michigan quotes Jason Furman:  Wolfers states that companies will always charge the highest prices possible, but that competition keeps prices in check. In the current situation, consumers have continued buying as prices have risen, showing that inflation is coming from consumer demand. He also says that corporate profits have been high because while consumer prices have risen 7.7% (slightly less than wholesale costs at >8%), wage increases (5%) have lagged behind the increase in prices, with the difference going to profits, a situation he sees as temporary.

UBS Global Wealth Management chief economist Paul Donovan said this has happened because post-pandemic household balance sheets have kept consumer spending demand strong enough to encourage producers to raise prices faster than costs, and because consumers have been gullible enough to find exaggerated narratives justifying such price hikes plausible.

Transitory vs persistent debate

A debate arose among economists early in 2021 as to whether inflation was a transitory effect of the world's emergence from the pandemic, or whether it would be persistent. Economists Larry Summers and Olivier Blanchard warned of persistent inflation, while Paul Krugman and U.S. Treasury Secretary Janet Yellen argued it would be transitory. Inflation continued to accelerate during 2021 and into 2022. In response, the Federal Reserve increased the fed funds rate by 25 basis points in March 2022, the first increase in three years, followed by 50 basis points in May, then a succession of four 75 basis point hikes in each of June, July, September and November. Some analysts considered these increases late and dramatic, arguing they might induce a recession. The combined moves put the fed funds rate at its highest level since the onset of the Great Recession in early 2008. Inflation in the Eurozone hit a record high of 8.1% in May, prompting the European Central Bank to announce that it would raise rates in July by 25 basis points, the first increase in eleven years, and again in September by 50 basis points. By November it had increased rates by a cumulative 200 basis points. After the Fed's third rate increase, Summers said "We are still headed for a pretty hard landing." By November 2022, the inflation rate in the United States had declined five months straight while job creation remained strong and third quarter real GDP growth was 3.2% on strong consumer spending, leading a growing number of investors to conclude a hard landing might be averted.

Impact of the 2022 Russian invasion of Ukraine 

Mark Zandi, chief economist of Moody's Analytics, analyzed United States Consumer Price Index components following the May 2022 report that showed an 8.6% inflation rate in the U.S. He found that by then the 2022 Russian invasion of Ukraine was the principal cause of higher inflation, comprising 3.5% of the 8.6%. He said oil and commodities prices jumped in anticipation of and response to the invasion, leading to higher gasoline prices. Resulting higher diesel prices led to higher transportation costs for consumer goods, notably food.

Russian gas supply curbs, which began in 2021, aggravated energy crunch caused by demand growth and global supply limitations during the post pandemic restrictions recovery. In Europe, gas prices increased by more than 450%, and electricity by 230% in less than a year. On February 22, 2022, before the Russian invasion, the German Government froze the Nord Stream 2 pipeline between Russia and Germany, causing natural gas prices to rise significantly.

On February 24, Russian military forces invaded Ukraine to overthrow the democratically elected government, and replace it with a Russian puppet government. Before the invasion, Ukraine accounted for 11.5% of the world's wheat crop market, and contributed 17% of the world's corn crop export market, and the invasion caused wheat and corn from Ukraine unable to reach international market, causing shortages, and result in dramatic rise in prices, that exacerbated to foodstuffs and biodiesel prices. Additionally, the price of Brent Crude Oil per barrel rose from $97.93 on February 25 to a high of $127.98 on March 8, this caused petrochemicals and other goods reliant on crude oil to rise in price as well.

The effect of sanctions on the Russian economy caused annual inflation in Russia to rise to 17.89%, its highest since 2002. Weekly inflation hit a high of 0.99% in the week of April 8, bringing YTD inflation in Russia to 10.83%, compared to 2.72% in the same period of 2021.

Regional impacts

While most countries saw a rise in their annual inflation rate during 2021 and 2022, some of the highest rates of increase have been in Europe, Brazil, Turkey and the United States. By June 2022, nearly half of Eurozone countries had double-digit inflation, and the region reached an average inflation rate of 8.6%, the highest since its formation in 1999. In response, at least 75 central banks around the world have aggressively increased interest rates. However, the World Bank warns that combating inflation with rate hikes has increased the risk of a global recession.

North Africa and Middle East
Countries in North Africa were disproportionally affected by inflation. Tunisia went through a crisis triggered by soaring energy prices and unprecedented inflation of foods in 2022. Moroccan household finances also were negatively affected by imported inflation. Annual inflation rates in North African countries rose to 15.3 percent compared to 6.4 percent in 2021, according to the Central Agency for Public Mobilization and Statistics.

In some North African countries, the inflation surge has encouraged hoarding practices by consumers. Price increases for basic food staples, such as coffee, were particularly high in parts of Asia and North Africa, where people spend a higher proportion of income on food and fuel than in the United States and Europe. Food producers of Nestle’s Middle East and North Africa (MENA) unit have noticed the stock-piling of non-perishable items, as a reaction to the surging inflation. Karim Al Bitar, head of consumer research and market intelligence at MENA said that the company is considering to make some products “more affordable” to consumers.

In Turkey, retail prices rose 9.65% in December compared to November, for an annual rate of 34%. Some of the largest increases were for electricity, natural gas, and gasoline. The economy was further strained by a currency crisis caused by a series of rate cuts by the central bank; the Turkish lira lost 44% of its value against the dollar during 2021. By August 2022, Turkey's inflation rate was 80.21%.

Africa south of the Sahara 
According to the IMF, median inflation approached 9% in August. Rising prices of food and "tradable goods like household products" have contributed most to this increase.

North America 

In the United States, the Consumer Price Index rose 6.8% between November 2020 and November 2021, spurred by price increases for gasoline, food, and housing. Higher energy costs caused the inflation to rise further in 2022, reaching 9.1%, a high not seen since 1981. In July 2022 the Fed increased the interest rate for the third time in the year, yet inflation remained high outpacing the growth in wages and spending. According to the Economic Policy Institute the minimum wage was worth less than any time since 1956 due to inflation. In November 2022, LendingClub said 63% of Americans were living paycheck to paycheck.

Nevertheless, the hikes were seen as faster and sooner than the response by European Central Bank, so while the euro fell the dollar remained relatively stronger, helping it to be the more valuable one for the first time in 20 years. On July 27 the Fed announced a fourth rate rise by 0.75 points, bringing the rate to a range between 2.25% and 2.5%; although an expected move to combat the inflation, the rise has been seen more cautiously as there are signs that the economy is entering a recession, which the rate rises could potentially aggravate. On July 28 data from the BEA showed that the economy shrunk for the second quarter in a row, which is commonly used to define a recession. BLS data showed that inflation eased on July to 8.5% from the 40 year peak reached on June at 9.1%. Annual inflation increased to 8.3% in August 2022, in part due to rising grocery prices. In September the Fed increased the interest for a fifth time in the year reaching a 14 year high. In November 2022, the year-over-year inflation rate was 7.1%, the lowest it has been since December 2021 but still much higher than average.

Inflation is believed to have played a major role in a decline in the approval rating of President Joe Biden, who took office in January 2021, being net negative starting in October of that year. Many Republicans have blamed the actions of Biden and fellow Democrats for fueling the surge.

Canada also saw multi-decade highs in inflation, hitting 5.1% in February 2022 and further increasing to 6.7% two months later. In April, inflation rose again to 6.8%, before jumping to 7.7% in May, the highest ever since 1983.

In July 2022, Mexico's INEGI reported a year-on-year increase in consumer prices of 8.15%, against a Central Bank target of 2–4%.

A recent analysis by the Federal Reserve Bank of Kansas City ascertained the role America is playing in the current inflationary trend worldwide. Before 2019, the U.S. was seen as a last resort for consumer spending during a global recession, but after 2020, U.S. exports have contributed to foreign inflation. At the same time, energy prices have gone up as well as the value of the U.S. dollar, which both increased monetary pressures on nations that mostly rely on energy imports. In effect, the strength of the U.S. dollar and sanctions on energy commodities have contributed to global inflation in 2022.

South America 

In Brazil, inflation hit its highest rate since 2003—prices rose 10.74% in November 2021 compared to November 2020. Economists predicted that inflation has peaked and that in fact the economy may be headed for recession, in part due to aggressive interest rate increases by the central bank. 

According to Austing Rating data, Brazil ended 2022 with the sixth lowest G20 inflation rate. Inflation recorded in Brazil in 2022 was below the United States for the first time in 15 years, in addition to being lower than that of the United Kingdom and the 6th lowest in the G20 (group of the 19 largest and most important economies in the world and the European Union).

In Argentina, a country with a chronic inflation problem, the interest rate was hiked to 69.5% in August as inflation has further deteriorated hitting a 20-year high at 70% and is forecasted to top 90% by the end of the year. Inflation hit past 100% in February 2023 for the first time since 1991.

Chile had low inflation for several years thanks to the monetary policy of its autonomous central bank. However, in 2022 there was a record intranual inflation of 14.1%, the highest in the last 30 years. There is a consensus among economists that Chilean inflation is mainly caused by endogenous factors, especially the aggressive expansionary policies during the COVID-19 pandemic and the massive withdrawals from pension funds. Economists have also predicted a possible recession by 2023 due to high interest rates to combat inflation.

Europe 

In the Netherlands, the average 2021 inflation rate was the highest since 2003. With energy prices having increased by 75%, December saw the highest inflation rate in decades.

In the UK, inflation reached a 40-year high of 10.1% in July 2022, driven by food prices, and further increase is anticipated in October when higher energy bills are expected to hit. In September the Bank of England warned the UK may already be in recession and in December the interest rate was raised by the ninth time in the year to 3.5% the highest level for 14 years.

Germany's inflation rate reached 11.7% in October, the highest level since 1951.

In France, inflation reached 5.8% in May, the highest in more than three decades.

An estimated 70,000 people protested against the Czech government as a result of rising energy prices.

In June 2022, the European Central Bank (ECB) decided to raise interest rates for the first time in more than eleven years due to the elevated inflation pressure. In July, the euro fell below the U.S. dollar for first time in 20 years, mainly due to fears of energy supply restrictions from Russia, but also because the ECB lagged behind the US, UK and other central banks in raising interest rates. Eurozone inflation hit 9.1% and 10% in August and September, respectively, prompting the ECB to raise interest rates for a second time in the year to 1.25% in early September. In October the inflation hit 10.7% the highest since records began in 1997. In February 2023 Eurozone core inflation hit a record 5.6%.

Asia 
In June 2022, the Philippines recorded 6.1% inflation, its highest since October 2018. The Philippine Statistics Authority forecasted that the number would most likely be higher in the following months. President Bongbong Marcos claimed that the record inflation rate was "not that high". On January 5, 2023, the Philippines rapidly increased to a record-breaking 8.1% inflation from December 2022.

In October 2022 the Japanese yen touched a 32-year low against U.S. dollar mainly because of the strength of the latter. In November the Japanese core inflation rate reached a 41-year high of 3.7%.

Oceania 
Inflation in New Zealand exceeded forecasts in 2022 July, reaching 7.3% which is the highest since 1990. Economists at ANZ reportedly said they expected faster interest rate increases to counteract inflationary pressures.

In Fiji, inflation rose to 4.7% in April 2022 compared to –2.4% in 2021. Food prices rose by 6.9% in April 2022, fuel increased by 25.2%, kerosene by 28.5% and gas by 27.7%.

See also
Economic impact of the COVID-19 pandemic
2021 United Kingdom natural gas supplier crisis
2022 stock market decline
2020s commodities boom
1970s commodities boom
Inflation Reduction Act of 2022
Acquisition of Credit Suisse by UBS
Collapse of Silicon Valley Bank
March 2023 United States bank failures

References

External links
 
 FT's Global inflation tracker

2021 in economics
2022 in economics
2023 in economics
Economic impact of the COVID-19 pandemic
Economy of the United States
Inflation